Tanushree is an Indian feminine given name, which means "beautiful".

Notable people 

 Tanusree Chakraborty, Indian Bengali model and actress
 Tanusri Saha-Dasgupta, Indian physicist
 Tanushree Dutta (born 1984), Indian actress and model
 Tanu Roy, Indian actress and model
 Tanusree Sarkar, Indian cricketer
 Tanusree Shankar (born 1956), Indian choreographers and actress
Tanusri Sengupta, Indian Bengali model and winner of Mrs Bengal Beautiful Eyes
 Tanushree Deb Barma, The first woman IAS Officer of Tripura

Hindu given names
Indian feminine given names